Vilkaviškis District Municipality is one of 60 municipalities in Lithuania. Its administrative center is Vilkaviškis.

References

Municipalities of Marijampolė County
Municipalities of Lithuania